Elections to Wolverhampton City Council were held on 3 May 2006 in Wolverhampton, England. One third of the council was up for election and the Labour Party kept overall control of the council.

Prior to the election, the composition of the council was

Labour Party 41
Conservative Party 15
Liberal Democrat 3
Independent 1

After the election, the composition of the council was

Labour Party 40
Conservative Party 17
Liberal Democrat 2 
Liberal 1

Election result

Number of candidates

Of the main political parties, both the Conservative Party and Labour Party fielded a full slate of 20 candidates each.

The Liberal Democrats fielded 19 candidates, failing to have a candidate in place in Wednesfield North.

One independent candidate stood in each of the following 2 wards:

Bilston East
Wednesfield North

The Green Party had a candidate in each of the following 2 wards:

Bilston North
Wednesfield South

The British National Party fielded only 1 candidate, in Wednesfield North ward.

The Liberal Party stood in only one ward, Heath Town.

2006
2000s in the West Midlands (county)
2006 English local elections